The Lightweight class in the boxing competition was the fifth-lowest weight class.  Lightweights were limited to those boxers weighing a maximum of 60 kilograms (132.3 lbs). 37 boxers qualified for this category. Like all Olympic boxing events, the competition was a straight single-elimination tournament. Both semifinal losers were awarded bronze medals, so no boxers competed again after their first loss. Bouts consisted of six rounds each. Five judges scored each bout.

Medalists

Schedule

Draw

Finals

Top Half

Bottom Half

References

Boxing at the 1968 Summer Olympics